Krasnogvardeysky District is an administrative district (raion), one of the twenty-six in Stavropol Krai, Russia. Municipally, it is incorporated as Krasnogvardeysky Municipal District. It is located in the northwest of the krai. Its administrative center is the rural locality (a selo) of Krasnogvardeyskoye. Population:  42,008 (2002 Census); 39,855 (1989 Census). The population of Krasnogvardeyskoye accounts for 39.1% of the district's total population.

References

Notes

Sources

Districts of Stavropol Krai